The Zombeatles are a zombie parody version of the rock group The Beatles. Stemming from Madison, Wisconsin band The Gomers, the group's  2006 video Hard Day's Night Of The Living Dead gained international status when horror film director and musician Rob Zombie chose it as one of his top YouTube Halloween video picks of 2007, resulting in over a million views worldwide.

In 2009 they released an album called Meat the Zombeatles and a mockumentary called The Zombeatles: All You Need Is Brains as well as touring New Jersey and appearing with John Wesley Harding and Eugene Mirman in their Cabinet Of Wonders Variety Show in April.

Revealed in the Behind the Music-like  mockumentary are historical references to a past zombie apocalypse; however, in the Zombeatles version a complete and parallel zombie universe is proposed via The Fab Gore, the Dead Sullivan Show, The Rolling Kidney Stones, The ZomMonkees, the Dead Clark Five, The ZomZombies, Boo Marley, Elvis Grisly, Dead Zeppelin, the Beach Boils, and appearances by Ewwyoko Ohno, the ZomRutles, Fester Fangs, Bob Killin, etc.

The band
The Zombeatles members are:
 Jaw Nlennon (styled after John Lennon) — played by Stephen Burke
 Pall Ickartney  (styled after Paul McCartney) — played by Gordon Ranney
 Gorge Harryson (styled after George Harrison) — played by Bucky Pope, and occasionally, for some US east coast gigs, played by Jon Dichter.
 Dingo Scarr (styled after Ringo Starr) — played by Biff Blumfumgagnge
 Killy Essen (styled after Billy Preston) – played by Dave Adler
 Eat Breast (styled after Pete Best) – played by Geoff Brady

Management
 Gorge Mortem (styled after George Martin) – played by Joe Soko
 Brain Epspleen (styled after Brian Epstein)

Other appearances in the film

 Angus MacAbre – a Scottish zombie comedian played by writer/director Doug Gordon
 Fester Fangs (styled after Lester Bangs) – played by Ben Wydeven
 Bob Killin' – (styled after Bob Dylan) – played by Ben Wydeven
 The Devil — played by Biff Blumfumgagnge

Discography
 Meat The Zombeatles, 2009 Beeftone Records
 All You Need Is Brains DVD, 2009 MacAbre Pictures

The Zombeatles Meat The Zombeatles  
"The Zombeatles 'Meat The Zombeatles'" first printing (2009)
Beeftone Records (U.S.)

"Halp! (styled after Help!)"
"Ate Brains A Week (styled after Eight Days a Week)"
"Brain (styled after Rain)"
"I Wanna Eat Your Hand (styled after I Want to Hold Your Hand)"
"She Dead (styled after She Said She Said)" 
"I'm Eating Through You (styled after I'm Looking Through You)"
"Dead Prudence (styled after Dear Prudence)"
"Hey Food (styled after Hey Jude)"

See also
List of zombie short films and other zombie-related projects

References

External links
Zombeatles Homepage
Zombeatles Facebook
Zombeatles Blogspot

American parodists
Musical groups from Wisconsin
Zombies
Parody musicians
Cover bands
The Beatles tribute bands
Culture of Madison, Wisconsin
American mockumentary films